Shuixian Temple may refer to the following in Taiwan:
 Bengang Shuixian Temple, in Xingang Township, Chiayi County
 Penghu Shuixian Temple, in Magong City, Penghu County